Herskind is a village in Skanderborg Municipality, Denmark.

References

Villages in Denmark
Cities and towns in the Central Denmark Region
Skanderborg Municipality